Raymond Parkinson (March 22, 1922 – June 28, 2018) was a Canadian psychiatrist and politician in British Columbia. He represented Vancouver-Burrard in the Legislative Assembly of British Columbia from 1966 to 1969 as a New Democratic Party (NDP) member.

He served in the Royal Canadian Army Medical Corps and the Medical Services unit of the Royal Canadian Air Force during World War II. After the war, Parkinson studied at the University of British Columbia and McGill University and went on to practise at the Medical Health Centre in Burnaby. He also consulted at the Fraser Valley Health Units in Chilliwack and Mission. Parkinson was defeated when he ran for reelection to the provincial assembly in 1969. After leaving politics, he returned to private practice in VVancouver. Parkinson was married to Ella McWilliam. He was a member of the board of governors for Simon Fraser University, serving five years as board chairman. Parkinson died in June 2018 at the age of 96.

References 

1922 births
2018 deaths
British Columbia New Democratic Party MLAs
Canadian military personnel of World War II
Politicians from Winnipeg